The Humboldt County Courthouse is a courthouse in Winnemucca, Nevada, the county seat of Humboldt County, Nevada, which was completed in 1921. It was listed on the National Register of Historic Places on August 19, 1983.

It was designed in Classical Revival style by architect Fredrick J. De Longchamps.  It has a monumental pedimented portico with Corinthian columns, and it has an entablature which runs all the way around the building.

The building was deemed "significant to the city of Winnemucca and Humboldt County as an outstanding example among the numerous public buildings designed by Frederick J. DeLongchamps, Nevada's most notable historical architect."

See also

Humboldt County, Nevada

References

County courthouses in Nevada
Winnemucca, Nevada
Buildings and structures in Humboldt County, Nevada
Government buildings completed in 1921
Courthouses on the National Register of Historic Places in Nevada
National Register of Historic Places in Humboldt County, Nevada